El Temps ('The Times') is a weekly newsmagazine, published in Valencia by Edicions del País Valencià since 1984. It is distributed throughout the whole Països Catalans.  It is edited by Eliseu Climent. The publication has offices in Barcelona, Valencia and Palma.

El Temps has become a reference to the Catalan Countries, where it has attained great prestige, so that in 2001, it achieved a circulation of 25,000 copies. In the mid 1990s, under the guidance of Vicent Partal, it was one of the first news media in Catalan to be present on internet.

Contributors 
 Fabià Estapé
 Glòria Marcos 
 Joan F. Mira
 Josep Maria Terricabras 
 Martí Domínguez 
 Miquel Payeras
 Sebastià Alzamora

Awards
 1994: Gabriel Alomar i Villalonga Award of the Premis 31 de Desembre  from Obra Cultural Balear.
 1996: Premi d'Honor Lluís Carulla

References

External links 
 Official website 
 El setmanari El Temps ja distribueix el nou CD-ROM amb programari en català 
 No perdeu El Temps 

1984 establishments in Spain
Catalan-language magazines
Magazines established in 1984
Mass media in Valencia
News magazines published in Spain
Weekly magazines published in Spain